Owens Creek is a stream in Cass County in the U.S. state of Missouri. It is a tributary of the South Grand River.

Owens Creek has the name of Elias Owen, a pioneer citizen.

See also
List of rivers of Missouri

References

Rivers of Cass County, Missouri
Rivers of Missouri